Cryptaspasma helota is a moth of the family Tortricidae. It is found in Sri Lanka, India, China, Taiwan, Japan and northern Vietnam.

References

Moths described in 1905
Microcorsini